3-beta-glucuronosyltransferase 1 (B3GAT1) is an enzyme that in humans is encoded by the B3GAT1 gene, whose enzymatic activity creates the CD57 epitope on other cell surface proteins. In immunology, the CD57 antigen (CD stands for cluster of differentiation) is also known as HNK1 (human natural killer-1) or LEU7. It is expressed as a carbohydrate epitope that contains a  residue in several adhesion molecules of the nervous system.

Function 

The protein encoded by this gene is a member of the glucuronyltransferase gene family. These enzymes exhibit strict acceptor specificity, recognizing nonreducing terminal sugars and their anomeric linkages. This gene product functions as the key enzyme in a glucuronyl transfer reaction during the biosynthesis of the carbohydrate epitope HNK-1 (human natural killer-1, also known as CD57 and LEU7). Alternate transcriptional splice variants have been characterized.

Immunohistochemistry

In anatomical pathology, CD57 (immunostaining) is similar to CD56 for use in differentiating neuroendocrine tumors from others. Using immunohistochemistry, CD57 molecule can be demonstrated in around 10 to 20% of lymphocytes, as well as in some epithelial, neural, and chromaffin cells. Among lymphocytes, CD57 positive cells are typically either T cells or NK cells, and are most commonly found within the germinal centres of lymph nodes, tonsils, and the spleen.

There is an increase in the number of circulating CD57 positive cells in the blood of patients who have recently undergone organ or tissue transplants, especially of the bone marrow, and in patients with HIV. Increased CD57+ counts have also been reported in rheumatoid arthritis and Felty's syndrome, among other conditions. High levels of CD57 expression amongst circulating CD8+ T cells is associated with other markers of immune ageing (immunosenescence) and may be associated with increased cancer risk in renal transplant recipients.

Neoplastic CD57 positive cells are seen in conditions as varied as large granular lymphocytic leukaemia, small-cell carcinoma, thyroid carcinoma, and neural and carcinoid tumours. Although the antigen is particularly common in carcinoid tumours, it is found in such a wide range of other conditions that it is of less use in distinguishing these tumours from others than more specific markers such as chromogranin and NSE.

References

Further reading

External links 
 
 

Clusters of differentiation